Daisey Traynham, known by the stage name Lady Daisey, is a Brooklyn born soul/funk singer. She spent her childhood touring with her parents’ band, and years later, settled in Jacksonville, Florida, where she met her husband/producer, Batsauce. They currently live in Europe and tour the States once a year.

Discography
Albums
 In My Headphones (2014) bbe, (with Batsauce)
 In My Pocket (2010) bbe, (with Batsauce)
 Party... Place (2007) Subcontact, (the Smile Rays)
 Smilin' On You (2007) Rawkus 50, (the Smile Rays)
 Lady Daisey & the House Guests (2007) Self released, (with Batsauce)
 Passion Is The Key (2006) Self released, (with Batsauce)
 Room For Two (2004) Self released, (with Batsauce)

EPs
 In My Pocket" – 12" vinyl EP' (2010) bbe, (with Batsauce)
 A Toast – 12" vinyl EP (2007) Jakarta, (the Smile Rays)
 Party... Place – 12" vinyl EP (2007) Subcontact, (the Smile Rays)

Singles
 "Get Got" (2014)  (bbe, featuring George Clinton)
 "We Will" (2014)  (bbe, with Batsauce)
 "Soul Strut" (2010)  (bbe, with Batsauce)
 "Magical" (2010)  (bbe, with Batsauce)

Remix albums
 Magical (2010) (with Batsauce, DJ Vadim, Paten Locke, Supa Dave West)

Compilations
 Musicians for Minneapolis (2008) (Benefit CD featuring "Fresh Tradition")
 Liquid Soul (2008) (Orama Entertainment)
 Digital Underground (2008) (featuring "Chicken")

Mixtapes
 Ladies First'' (2010) (Katie Bee)

References

External links
 Official Website
 Lady Daisey at bbe

1973 births
Living people
21st-century American singers
21st-century American women singers